Ex illis  is a miniature wargame universe set in a realistic-fantasy world.   The game was originally released by Bastion studio but is now managed by Chinchilla Games.

Origin
Originally called Wargaming 2.0, the game used software called the Rule Keeper to create an interface for actions management instead of relying on rule interpretation by players. This has the advantage of making the game very easy to play for new players. The software is also goof at calculating many modifiers and random numbers. This gives the game depth and complexity. Armies are built outside the Rule Keeper software on the website.

Features

Ex illis Wargaming 2.0 also features:
 Unit leveling 
 Unit specialisation on some units
 Talent trees for each unit
 Square based movement
 Color matching between your miniatures and the software (done in army builder)
 Game data tracking

Ex illis : Wargaming 2.0 falls in the category of digitally enhanced board games and might actually be the first physical game to use an iPad as a companion.

Universe 
Ex illis is set in an uchronia where Angels, Demons, Faeries and Magic has been revealed to the middle-age Europe around 1246 A.D. The setting is backed by a rich narration available to players through the game's wiki. Many factions are available to player via a soft faction system where units can be set to one of many allegiance. That faction will grant bonus and the player can use the faction system to create synergy betweens its units.

Miniatures 
Staying consistent with the narration, Ex illis offers a realistic look and feel for their miniatures. Details, weapon sizes, hands, heads and other anatomical proportions are much closer to actual human proportions than it would be on other tabletop wargames.

So far, 12 units, 4 heroes and 2 named heroes have been released.

Paper rulebook for Ex illis 
In September 2013, Chinchilla games announced on Facebook that they would release a paper rulebook to please old-school gamers that prefer not to use the Rule Keeper software. The rulebook will be the object of a Kickstarter campaign.

References

External links 
 
 
 Ex illis wiki
 Musing of an Avalon Stogie  Ex Illis Review

Miniature wargames
Board games introduced in 2009